Tenant Chilumba (born 22 August 1972) is a Zambian football manager and former player.

Playing career
Born in Mufulira, Chilumba played football in the local league with Kabwe Warriors and Power Dynamos. He played professionally in South Africa and Saudi Arabia, with AmaZulu and Al Taawon.

Chilumba played for the Zambia national football team from 1990 to 1998. He was part of Zambia's African Cup of Nations teams in 1994 and 1998, helping the team reach the 1994 final in Tunisia and scoring a goal as they were eliminated in the 1998 group stage in Burkina Faso.

Managerial career
After he retired from playing, Chilumba began a coaching career. He enjoyed success managing clubs in Zimbabwe, winning the 2012 ZIFA coach of the year with Hwange Colliery. More recently, he has managed in his native Zambia, leading Power Dynamos F.C., NAPSA Stars, and Kabwe Warriors F.C. He is currently managing Forest Rangers F.C.

References

External links
 

1972 births
Living people
Zambian footballers
Zambia international footballers
1994 African Cup of Nations players
1998 African Cup of Nations players
Power Dynamos F.C. players
Kabwe Warriors F.C. players
AmaZulu F.C. players
Al-Taawoun FC players
Saudi Professional League players
Association football midfielders
Zambian expatriate footballers
Expatriate footballers in Saudi Arabia
Expatriate soccer players in South Africa
Zambian football managers
Zambian expatriate football managers
Expatriate football managers in Zimbabwe
Zambian expatriate sportspeople in Saudi Arabia
Zambian expatriate sportspeople in Zimbabwe